Byron Gray Stout (January 12, 1829 – June 19, 1896) was a politician from the U.S. state of Michigan.

Stout was born in Richmond, New York and moved with his parents to Michigan in 1831.  He attended the common schools and graduated from the University of Michigan at Ann Arbor in 1851.  He studied law and became superintendent and principal of Pontiac High School in 1853 and 1854 respectively.

Stout served as a member of the Michigan House of Representatives in 1855 and 1857, serving as speaker in the latter year.  He was also member of the Michigan Senate in 1860 and served as president pro tempore.  He was a candidate for Governor of Michigan in 1862, losing to incumbent Republican Austin Blair.

He was a member of the National Union Convention at Philadelphia in 1866 and delegate to the Democratic National Conventions in 1868, 1880, and 1888.  He was defeated for election to Congress to represent Michigan's 5th congressional district in 1868 and 1870, losing to Omar D. Conger.  Prior to 1869, he engaged in private banking.

In 1890, Stout was elected as a Democrat from Michigan's 6th congressional district to the 52nd Congress, serving from March 4, 1891, to March 3, 1893.  He was not a candidate for reelection in 1892.

Byron G. Stout served as president of the Oakland County Bank from 1893 to 1896.  He died in Pontiac, Michigan on June 19, 1896, and is interred in Oak Hill Cemetery.

References

The Political Graveyard

External links

 

1829 births
1896 deaths
University of Michigan alumni
Speakers of the Michigan House of Representatives
Democratic Party Michigan state senators
Burials in Michigan
People from Richmond, New York
Politicians from Pontiac, Michigan
Democratic Party members of the United States House of Representatives from Michigan
19th-century American politicians